Disco 4 (also known as Disco Four: Remixed by Pet Shop Boys) is the fourth remix album by English synth-pop duo Pet Shop Boys, released on 8 October 2007 by Parlophone on CD and vinyl. It was not made available as a digital download, due to licensing difficulties for each track.

The album is mainly a compilation of Pet Shop Boys remixes of songs by other artists, a first among any of their releases to date. It also includes a previously unreleased mix of "Integral" and the maxi-mix of "I'm with Stupid", previously released on the Japanese edition of Fundamental.

Since the album consists mostly of songs by other artists, it was ineligible for the UK Albums Chart. Instead, the album reached number 15 on the UK Compilation Chart and number three on the UK Dance Albums Chart.

To promote Disco Four, the PSB Perfect Immaculate mix of "Integral" had a limited service to club and selected radio DJs with a music video released on the duo's official website and YouTube.

Track listing

Notes
  signifies a remix producer
  signifies an original producer
  signifies a remixer and additional producer

Personnel
Credits adapted from the liner notes of Disco 4.

Pet Shop Boys
 Neil Tennant – additional vocals 
 Chris Lowe – additional vocals

Additional musicians
 Pete Gleadall – programming ; additional vocals 
 Tom Stephan – additional vocals 
 Miguel Mateo-Garcia – additional vocals 
 Sam Taylor-Wood – additional vocals

Technical
 Pet Shop Boys – remix production ; production ; remix, additional production 
 Pete Gleadall – remix engineering ; mix engineering ; engineering 
 David Bowie – original production 
 Brian Eno – original production 
 Bob Kraushaar – mix engineering ; remix engineering 
 Trevor Horn – original production 
 Goetz Botzenhardt – mix engineering

Artwork
 Mark Farrow – design, art direction
 Pet Shop Boys – design, art direction
 John Ross – photography

Charts

References

2007 remix albums
Albums produced by Brian Eno
Albums produced by David Bowie
Albums produced by Madonna
Albums produced by Stuart Price
Albums produced by Trevor Horn
Parlophone remix albums
Pet Shop Boys remix albums
Sequel albums